Black Friday is the second mixtape by American rapper Lil' Kim, released on February 14, 2011 through PayPal. The title track is a response to Nicki Minaj's song "Roman's Revenge". The mixtape also contains the track "Grindin' Makin' Money", a collaboration which features rappers Birdman and Nicki Minaj, which Kim claims ignited the feud between her and Minaj, as well as another diss song towards Minaj titled "Pissin' on 'Em".

Background 
The creation of this mixtape was inspired by Kim's feud with Nicki Minaj. The cover of the mixtape, featuring a decapitated Nicki Minaj, was a fan's idea. The mixtape's title is a play on Minaj's debut album Pink Friday. The music video for the title track was released on November 26, 2010.

Critical reception 
Black Friday was heavily panned by music critics. Kid Fury of Vibe described its content as "tragic shit" and commented that the mixtape "lacks consistency, edge, and originality". Slant Magazines Huw Jones gave it one-and-a-half out of five stars and felt that its production lacks "originality". Jones also panned Lil Kim's lyrics and disses towards Minaj as "inane", writing that "there are some pert jabs dotted among the tactless insults, but for the most part, it's a senseless rant". Kazeem Famuyide of The Source wrote that "I know it's a dated name ... but I don't think it's that crazy as far as appealing to her hardcore fan base". Jozen Cummings of XXL wrote facetiously, "It's not that we refuse to pay for music, we'd just much rather have an option to not do it. If you force any price tag on us without giving us a decent amount of free music to sample from, we're scoffing at that $9.99".

Track listing 
The track listing for the mixtape was revealed by Rap-Up.

References 

2011 mixtape albums
Lil' Kim albums
Nicki Minaj